Liu Zhongchang (born 31 August 1962) is a Chinese former football player and current manager.

Club career
Liu entered Dalian youth team in 1974. He moved to Liaoning youth team in 1976. Between 1983 and 1987, he played for Liaoning.

In 1988, he returned to Dalian. Dalian relegated in the 1988 season and faced poor performance in the 1989 season. Liu was moved from forward to midfielder by Qi Wusheng, and had outrageous performance. Dalian promoted in the 1989 season as runner-up.

In 1992, he decided to retire. He was recruited by Dalian Wanda in 1993 season, and after hard training, he was able to pass the stamina test, to play for the team between 1994 and 1995, and won Dalian Wanda's first professional league champion. 

In 1996, he retired again, and started to work as manager for Shaanxi Guoli. He also played for Shenzhen Jinpeng in the 1996 Jia-B League.

International career 
In 1986, Liu participated in the Asian Games representing China.  In the 5–1 victory against Bahrain, he scored a goal.

Managerial career

In 2001, he became the manager of Dalian Women's FC.

In 2002, he joined Sichuan Better City as assistant manager. He became the manager in the 2005 season. The team was dissolved after that season.

Between 2006 and 2012, he worked at Dalian Shide as assistant manager for the first team and women's team. In 2010, he shortly took the caretaker position for Dalian Shide after Xu Hong was sacked.

In 2013, Liu joined the newly established Dalian Transcendence in the China League Two. The team gained promotion into the China League One in 2015. He resigned in 2016 due to poor performances in the League One.

In 2017, he joined Zhejiang Yiteng and worked as team official. He joined Dalian Yifang during the season as team official. In the 2018 season, he left the team as Ma Lin was sacked.

Managerial statistics

Honors

Player
Liaoning FC
 Chinese Jia-A League: 1985, 1987
 Chinese FA Cup: 1984, 1986

Dalian
Chinese FA Cup: 1992

Dalian Wanda
Chinese Jia-A League: 1994

References

External links

1962 births
Living people
Chinese footballers
China international footballers
Footballers from Dalian
Dalian Shide F.C. players
Chinese Super League players
Association football forwards
Chinese football managers
Chinese Super League managers